Louis Jackson is a former professional American football running back in the National Football League, playing for the New York Giants in 1981. He played college football for Cal Poly San Luis Obispo.

Early life 
Jackson graduated from Roosevelt High in Fresno, California, where he earned All-Metro League honors.

College career 
At Cal Poly, Jackson majored in industrial arts. Following his 1980 senior season, during which he carried 287 times for 1,424 rushing yards and 12 scores, Jackson was selected for AFCA Kodak All-American accolades, making a list merging both NCAA Division II and NAIA Division I schools at the time.

Professional career 
Jackson was selected by the New York Giants in the seventh round of the 1981 NFL Draft.

Wearing number 21, Jackson played in 11 games as a rookie for the Giants, including three starts. He rushed for 68 yards and a touchdown on 27 carries, and caught three passes for 25 yards. His lone touchdown came on a 4-yard run in the second quarter of a 30-27 loss to Washington on November 15.

After being released by the Giants in September 1982, Jackson went on to play three seasons in the USFL, first for the Oakland Invaders from 1983 to 1984 and then for the Portland Breakers in 1985.

References 

American football running backs

Year of birth missing (living people)
Cal Poly Mustangs football players
Living people